Michael Plekon (Yonkers born April 3, 1948) is an American priest, professor, author, sociologist and theologian. He has published more than a dozen books, as well as hundreds of journal papers, book chapters and reviews on faith and holiness.
His works include religious social history, social theory and its connections with theology, the works of Søren Kierkegaard, contemporary Eastern Orthodox theology and theologians of the Russian emigration and saints. More recently, his research and publications explore persons of faith, seeking identity and God in spiritual journeys. He is also writing about persons of faith struggling for social justice and for ways of rediscovering holiness in ordinary life. He is especially interested in the encounter with God in the everyday.

Plekon's efforts to describe what holiness looks like in our time, the distinctive characteristics of women and men of faith, have been praised by colleagues. They see it as an important "new hagiography" or writing about saints who are our contemporaries, like Dorothy Day, Mother Teresa, Thomas Merton or Daniel Berrigan.

Plekon has had a long career as an academic, theologian and clergy member. Since 1977, Plekon has taught at Baruch College, first as an Assistant Professor, and eventually as a Professor within the Weissman School of Arts and Sciences since 1998. In addition to his academic work, he has served as an Associate Priest as St. Gregory Orthodox Church in Wappingers Falls, New York since 1996. Ordained in 1983 in the Lutheran Church in America (LCA), later the Evangelical Lutheran Church in America (ELCA) Plekon was later received into the Orthodox Church in America (OCA). For almost 40 years, he has served as a parish pastor, alongside teaching and research. He is writing about his pastoral experiences and is examining the importance of community, not only for church but for meaning and depth in one's life in a book in progress. This work also deals with our need, in a diverse America, to cross into other cultures and religious traditions with respect, learning from them and becoming deeper persons from this encounter. This was something he experienced in his own family's ecumenical sensitivity.

Plekon's book, Uncommon Prayer: Prayer in Everyday Experience, was named by Spirituality and Practice as one of the best spiritual books of 2016 and was the Gold Winner of the 2016 Foreword INDIES book of the Year Award in the Adult Nonfiction, Religion category.

Biography

Plekon's interest in studying religion began early on when he chose to pursue a bachelor's degree in Sociology and Philosophy from the Catholic University in Washington, D.C. in 1970. He later obtained a master's degree and a doctorate in Sociology and Religion from Rutgers University in New Jersey. Plekon's doctoral advisor was renowned sociologist of religion and theologian Peter L. Berger, who mentions Plekon in his memoir among his students of interest as an "expert in the Orthodox (Christian) diaspora in the West.".

Plekon met his wife Jeanne through a long-time friend while she was pursuing a master's in art history and museum studies at The Clark Institute, Williams College. They have been married since 1976 and have two children, Paul and Hannah.

Awards and honors

Plekon has received more than twenty research awards in his years at Baruch College of the city University of New York, including annual PSC-CUNY Faculty Research Awards, several Baruch Faculty Fellowships for a year of study and other research grants.

 Ecumenical advisor, Lutheran Forum, 1996–2007
 Nominee, Excellence in Teaching Award, Baruch College, 1981, 1983, 1985, 1987, 1998
 Election as President of the Board of Lutheran Ministries in Higher Education, 1982–87
 Associate member, Columbia University Seminar in Religious Studies, 1982–87
 Honoree, City University of New York Salute to Scholars, 1981
 National Endowment for the Humanities Fellow, honorary Fulbright, American Scandinavian Institute and Lutheran World Federation Fellow at the University of Copenhagen's Institute for Systematic Theology

References

Further reading
 Michael Plekon, Community as Church, Church as Community, Eugene OR: Cascade, 2021.
 Michael Plekon, editor, Fossil or Leaven: The Church We Hand Down: Essays in Honor of the 50th Anniversary of New Skete, Montreal and Cambridge NY: Alexander Press/New Skete Monasteries, 272 pages, 2017.
 Michael Plekon, The World as Sacrament: Ecumenical Reflections on Worldly Spirituality, Collegeville, MN: Liturgical Press,  272 pages, 2017.
 Michael Plekon, Uncommon Prayer: Prayer in Everyday Experience, University of Notre Dame Press, 2016, 285 pages. 
 Michael Plekon, Maria Gywn McDowell, Elizabeth Schroeder, eds., "The Church Has Left the Building": Faith, Parish and Ministry in the 21st Century, Eugene OR: Cascade, 2016, 141 pages.
 John A. Jillions and Michael Plekon, editors, Jerry Ryan, translator, Antoine Arjakovsky, The Way:  Religious Thinkers of the Russian Emigration in Paris and their Journal, University of Notre Dame Press, 2013, 766 pages. 
 Michael Plekon, Saints as they really are: Patterns of Holiness in Our Time, University of Notre Dame Press, 2012, 277 pages. 
 Michael Plekon, editor, Jerry Ryan, translator: Olga Lossky, Towards the endless day: a life of Elisabeth Behr-Sigel (1907–2005), University of Notre Dame Press,  2010, 334 pages. 
 Michael Plekon, Hidden Holiness, University of Notre Dame Press, 2009, 212 pages. 
 Michael Plekon, editor & author of introductory essay, Vitaly Permiakov translator, Nicolas Afanasiev, The Church of the Holy Spirit,  University of Notre Dame Press, 2007, paper, 2012, 327 pages. 
 Michael Plekon, editor, translator, author of introductory essay,  Tradition Alive: An Anthology on the Church and the Christian Life in Our Time, edited,  introductory essay,  Sheed & Ward/Rowman & Littlefield, 2003. 272 pages.
 Michael Plekon, Living Icons: People of Faith in the Eastern Church and Holiness in Our Time,  University of Notre Dame Press, 2002, paper, 2004, 337 pages. 
 Michael Plekon, editor, translator, Discerning the Signs of the Times: The Vision of Elisabeth Behr-Sigel,  with Sarah E. Hinlicky,  Crestwood NY: St. Vladimir's Seminary Press, 2001, 148 pages.
 Michael Plekon, translator and editor, In the World, Of the Church: A Paul Evdokimov Reader, with Alexis Vinogradov,  Crestwood NY: Oakwood/St. Vladimir's Seminary Press, 2001, 273 pages.
 Michael Plekon, translator, revised translation of Paul Evdokimov, Les âges de la vie spirituelle, Paris: Desclée de Brouwer, 1964: Ages of the Spiritual Life, with Alexis Vinogradov, original trans. by Sr. Gertrude, S.P., Crestwood NY: St. Vladimir's Seminary Press, 1998,  263 pages.
 Michael Plekon and William S. Wiecher, editors. The Church: Selected Writings of Arthur Carl Piepkorn, Delhi NY: American Lutheran Publication Bureau, 1993, edited and introductory essay, with William S. Wiecher, 304 pages. Second edition, 2009.
 Michael Plekon, "The Liturgy of Life: Alexander Schmemann," Religions, special issue, "Inward Being and Outward Identity: The Orthodox Churches in the 21st Century, 2017.
 Peter L. Berger, "Adventures of an Accidental Sociologist," Amherst NY: Prometheus Books, 2011, 110.

Sources
 Academia.edu page with CV and texts of more than 60 articles
 Faculty Page at Baruch College
 Author interviews at Eastern Christian Books website
 College Talk with Weissman School of Arts and Sciences Dean Aldemaro Romero Jr. Romero video
 College talk with Dean Romero article
 Online interview at AFR
 The Liturgy of Life: Alexander Schmemann by Michael Plekon
 Adventures of an Accidental Sociologist: How to Explain the World Without Becoming a Bore

Rutgers University alumni
20th-century American Lutheran clergy
Baruch College faculty
1948 births
Living people
American Eastern Orthodox priests
Eastern Orthodox priests in the United States